Eroni Leilua (born 15 April 1993) is a Samoan sailor. He competed in the Laser event at the 2020 Summer Olympics, becoming the first Samoan to represent the country in that event.

Biography
Leilua is from Vaivase Uta in Upolu. He grew up in Samoa but moved to Auckland, New Zealand at the age of 12 with his family. He subsequently studied commerce and physical education at the University of Otago.

He represented Samoa at two Pacific Games and a world sailing championship before competing in the 2020 Tokyo Olympics. At the 2011 Pacific Games in Nouméa he won bronze (alongside Myka Stanley) in the team laser competition. At the 2019 Pacific Games in Apia he came fourth in the individual Laser Radial, but won gold (alongside Nicky Touli) in the men's team competition.

References

External links
 
 
 

1993 births
Living people
University of Otago alumni
Samoan male sailors (sport)
Olympic sailors of Samoa
Sailors at the 2020 Summer Olympics – Laser
Place of birth missing (living people)